Sonoma Adventist College is a co-educational tertiary institution situated in Kokopo in Papua New Guinea. It is operated by the Seventh-day Adventist Church and is accredited by the Adventist Accrediting Association.

It is a part of the Seventh-day Adventist education system, the world's second largest Christian school system.

Academic divisions 
The college is divided into the following divisions
Agriculture
Building construction
Commerce
Education
Theology

History 
During the 1993 eruption of the Rabaul volcanoes, Sonoma was a registered refugee camp with over 2,000 extra people on campus.
It was founded by Pr Alex Currie

See also

 List of Seventh-day Adventist colleges and universities
 Seventh-day Adventist education
 Seventh-day Adventist Church
 Seventh-day Adventist theology
 History of the Seventh-day Adventist Church
Adventist Colleges and Universities
 List of Seventh-day Adventist medical schools
 List of Seventh-day Adventist secondary schools
List of Seventh-day Adventist secondary and elementary schools
List of Seventh-day Adventist hospitals
Christian school

References 

Universities and colleges affiliated with the Seventh-day Adventist Church
Education in Papua New Guinea
Educational organisations based in Papua New Guinea
Religious organisations based in Papua New Guinea
Schools in Papua New Guinea